Amanda Knox is a 2016 American documentary film about Amanda Knox, twice convicted and later acquitted of the 2007 murder of Meredith Kercher. It premiered at the Toronto International Film Festival on September 10, 2016, and on Netflix on September 30, 2016.

Synopsis
Featuring interviews with Amanda Knox, her ex-boyfriend Raffaele Sollecito, Italian prosecutor Giuliano Mignini, and Daily Mail reporter Nick Pisa, the documentary chronicles the murder of Knox's roommate Meredith Kercher and the subsequent investigation, trials and appeals. Her notoriety bolstered by tabloid journalism, Knox was convicted of murder and spent four years in an Italian prison before her acquittal by the Supreme Court of Cassation. "I think I'm trying to explain what it feels like to be wrongfully convicted," Knox explained in an interview. "To either be this terrible monster or to be this regular person who is vulnerable."

Reception
, this film has an approval rating of 84% on Rotten Tomatoes, based on 43 reviews with an average score of 7.2/10. On Metacritic, the film has a weighted average score of 78 out of 100, based on 17 critics, indicating "generally favorable reviews".

The film was nominated for the Primetime Emmy Awards for Outstanding Documentary or Nonfiction Special and Outstanding Writing for Nonfiction Programming.

References

External links
 
 
 

2016 films
2016 documentary films
American documentary films
Danish documentary films
Documentary films about lawyers
Films about lawyers
Films about miscarriage of justice
Films set in Italy
Netflix original documentary films
2010s American films